The 2015 season is Chonburi's 6th season in the Thai Premier League of Chonburi Football Club.

Transfers

In

 Total spending:  ~ ฿0

Out

 Total income:  ~ ฿0

Loans in

Loans out

Matches

Pre-season

League table

Results by round

League

FA Cup

League Cup

References

Chonburi F.C. seasons
Chonburi